The 2018 UCI Urban Cycling World Championships was the second edition of the UCI Urban Cycling World Championships, and was held in Chengdu, China for the second consecutive year.

The 2018 championships comprised events in freestyle BMX, mountain bike trials and mountain bike eliminator.

Medal summary

Freestyle BMX

Park

Mountain bike trials

20 inch

26 inch

Team

Mountain bike eliminator

Medal table

References

External links

UCI

UCI Urban Cycling World Championships
UCI Urban Cycling World Championships